Archyala lindsayi is a species of moth in the family Tineidae. This species is endemic to New Zealand. It is classified as "At Risk, Naturally Uncommon" by the Department of Conservation.

Taxonomy 
This species was described by Alfred Philpott in 1927 and given the name Tinea lindsayi. Philpott used a specimen Stewart Lindsay collected at Mount Grey in North Canterbury and named the species in his honour. In 1928 George Hudson discussed and illustrated the species in his book The Butterflies and Moths of New Zealand. However John S. Dugdale is of the opinion that the illustration is an inaccurate representation of the species. In 1988 Dugdale placed this species within the genus Archyala. The holotype specimen is held at the Canterbury Museum.

Description 
Philpott described the species as follows:

Distribution 
This species is endemic to New Zealand. This species is only known from its type specimen and at its type locality of Mount Grey.

Life history 
It has been hypothesised that larvae of this species inhabits dead wood boring into it and feeding on the fungus-infected wood.

Conservation Status  
This species has been classified as having the "At Risk, Naturally Uncommon" conservation status under the New Zealand Threat Classification System.

References

Moths described in 1927
Tineidae
Moths of New Zealand
Endemic fauna of New Zealand
Endangered biota of New Zealand
Endemic moths of New Zealand